The 2014 Guangzhou R&F season is the 4th year in Guangzhou R&F's existence and its 4th season in the Chinese football league, also its 3rd season in the top flight.

Coaching staff

Squad

Winter

Summer

References

Chinese football clubs 2014 season
Guangzhou City F.C. seasons